Biga District is a district of the Çanakkale Province of Turkey. Its seat is the city of Biga. Its area is 1,310 km2, and its population is 91,537 (2021).

Composition
There are three municipalities in Biga District:
 Biga
 Gümüşçay
 Karabiga

There are 108 villages in Biga District:

 Abdiağa
 Adliye
 Ağaköy
 Ahmetler
 Akkayrak
 Akköprü
 Akpınar
 Aksaz
 Akyaprak
 Ambaroba
 Arabaalan
 Arabakonağı
 Aşağıdemirci
 Ayıtdere
 Aziziye
 Bahçeli
 Bakacak
 Bakacaklıçiftliği
 Balıklıçeşme
 Bekirli
 Bezirganlar
 Bozlar
 Çakırlı
 Camialan
 Çelikgürü
 Çeltik
 Çeşmealtı
 Cihadiye
 Çınardere
 Çınarköprü
 Çömlekçi
 Danişment
 Değirmencik
 Dereköy
 Dikmen
 Doğancı
 Eğridere
 Elmalı
 Emirorman
 Eskibalıklı
 Eybekli
 Gemicikırı
 Geredelli
 Gerlengeç
 Geyikkırı
 Göktepe
 Güleç
 Gündoğdu
 Gürçeşme
 Gürgendere
 Güvemalan
 Hacıhüseyinyaylası
 Hacıköy
 Hacıpehlivan
 Harmanlı
 Havdan
 Hisarlı
 Hoşoba
 İdriskoru
 Ilıcabaşı
 İlyasalanı
 Işıkeli
 İskenderköy
 Kahvetepe
 Kalafat
 Kaldırımbaşı
 Kanibey
 Kapanbeleni
 Karaağaç
 Karacaali
 Karahamzalar
 Karapürçek
 Kaşıkçıoba
 Katrancı
 Kayapınar
 Kaynarca
 Kazmalı
 Kemer
 Kepekli
 Kocagür
 Kozçeşme
 Koruoba
 Örtülüce
 Osmaniye
 Otlukdere
 Ovacık
 Paşaçayı
 Pekmezli
 Ramazanlar
 Şakirbey
 Sarıca
 Sarıkaya
 Sarısıvat
 Sarnıçköy
 Savaştepe
 Sazoba
 Selvi
 Sığırcık
 Sinekçi
 Şirinköy
 Tokatkırı
 Türkbakacak
 Yanıç
 Yeniçiftlik
 Yenimahalle
 Yeşilköy
 Yolindi
 Yukarıdemirci

References

Districts of Çanakkale Province